Dilawarabad is a village in Chhachh Region of District Attock. It was founded in 1972.

 
Pukhto is widely spoken among the residents. Main Pashtuns Tribes Include Malizai, Sokani, Mezad Khel and Bakshesh Khel.

References

Villages in Attock District